Nanzan (南山) was one of three kingdoms which controlled Okinawa, Japan, in the 14th century.

It may also refer to:

 Nanzan University in Nagoya, Japan

See also
 南山 (disambiguation)
 山南 (disambiguation)